Kendra Lister (born October 4, 1987 as Kendra Dickison) is a Canadian curler from Fredericton, New Brunswick. She currently plays third on Team Jaclyn Crandall.

Career

Women's
Lister joined the Quillian (Robichaud at the time) rink after the 2016–17 season. Her team consisted of skip Robichaud, third Melissa Adams who also just joined the team and second Nicole Arsenault Bishop. The team had early success winning the Jim Sullivan Curling Classic World Curling Tour event. Their successes continued into January when they won the 2018 New Brunswick Scotties Tournament of Hearts, earning the right to represent New Brunswick at the 2018 Scotties Tournament of Hearts. It was Lister's first provincial women's title. The Quillian rink would have a very successful tournament, finishing the new pool play format with a 4–3 record. They won their final seeding game to finish the tournament with a 5–3 record. The following season, her team won the Tim Hortons Spitfire Arms Cash Spiel on the World Curling Tour. They could not defend their provincial title at the 2019 New Brunswick Scotties Tournament of Hearts where they lost to the Sarah Mallais rink in the semifinal.

After failing to win the provincial championship in 2020 as well, Team Quillian disbanded and Lister joined Melissa Adams new team with Justine Comeau at third and Jaclyn Tingley at second. Due to the COVID-19 pandemic in New Brunswick, the 2021 provincial championship was cancelled. As the reigning provincial champions, Team Crawford was given the invitation to represent New Brunswick at the 2021 Scotties Tournament of Hearts, but they declined due to work and family commitments. Team Adams was then invited in their place, which they accepted. One member of Team Adams, Justine Comeau, opted to not attend the Scotties, with Nicole Arsenault Bishop stepping in to play second on the team. At the Hearts, they finished with a 3–5 round robin record, failing to qualify for the championship round.

Mixed doubles
Lister plays mixed doubles with her husband Daniel Lister. The duo finished 4–2 at the 2019 New Brunswick Mixed Doubles Championship, losing out in the qualification playoff game. They made it one stage further at the 2020 championship, losing out in the quarterfinals. At the 2021 provincial championship, they lost out in the C event final.

Personal life
Lister is employed as a senior internal auditor. She is married and has two children.

Teams

References

External links

Canadian women curlers
Curlers from New Brunswick
Living people
1987 births
People from Miramichi, New Brunswick
Sportspeople from Fredericton
Canadian accountants